Hi-Fly is a 1976 album by jazz singer Karin Krog and saxophonist Archie Shepp.

Reception 

Allmusic awarded the album four and a half stars with reviewer Michael G. Nastos writing that "All standards interpreted innovatively."

The Rough Guide to Jazz wrote that "Krog is impressive with Shepp, surviving a sometimes overbearing context and making an exquisite job of Carla Bley's "Sing Me Softly of the Blues" for which Krog wrote her own lyrics".

Track listing 
 "Sing Me Softly of the Blues" (Carla Bley, Karin Krog) - 6:21
 "Steam" (Archie Shepp) - 8:07
 "Day Dream" (Duke Ellington, Billy Strayhorn, John La Touche) - 9:26
 "(In My) Solitude" (Ellington, Eddie DeLange, Irving Mills) - 3:34
 "Hi-Fly" (Randy Weston) - 14:01
 "Soul Eyes" (Mal Waldron) - 6:38

Personnel 
 Karin Krog - vocals
 Archie Shepp - tenor saxophone
 Charles Greenlee - trombone
 Jon Balke - piano
 Arild Andersen - double bass
 Cameron Brown - single bass
 Beaver Harris - drums

References 

1976 albums
Archie Shepp albums
Karin Krog albums
Mainstream Records albums